Abdul Wasi (born 6 July 2002) is an Afghan cricketer. He made his international debut for the Afghanistan cricket team in March 2021.

He made his first-class debut for Amo Region in the 2018 Ahmad Shah Abdali 4-day Tournament on 1 March 2018 and was named the man of the match. He was the leading wicket-taker for Amo Region in the tournament, with 54 dismissals in ten matches, and he was also named as the player of the series.

He made his List A debut for Amo Region in the 2018 Ghazi Amanullah Khan Regional One Day Tournament on 10 July 2018. He made his Twenty20 debut on 13 October 2019, for Speen Ghar Tigers in the 2019 Shpageeza Cricket League.

In November 2019, he was named in Afghanistan's squad for the 2019 ACC Emerging Teams Asia Cup in Bangladesh. In February 2021, he was named as a reserve player in Afghanistan's Test squad for their series against Zimbabwe. He made his Test debut for Afghanistan, against Zimbabwe, on 2 March 2021.

References

External links
 

2002 births
Living people
Afghan cricketers
Afghanistan Test cricketers
Amo Sharks cricketers
Place of birth missing (living people)